Star (stylized as ST★R) is a content hub within the Disney+ streaming service that launched on February 23, 2021. The hub is available in a subset of countries where Disney+ is operated. In Latin America, a separate streaming service, Star+, was launched on August 31, 2021.

Star features adult-oriented television and film content from the libraries of Disney subsidiaries, including FX Networks, Freeform, ABC Signature, 20th Television, 20th Television Animation, 20th Century Studios, 20th Century Animation, Searchlight Pictures, Touchstone Pictures and Hollywood Pictures. It also features licensed non-Disney branded content through Disney Platform Distribution.

History

Background 
The "Star" brand originated as a Hong Kong-based satellite broadcaster, which operated under that name as an acronym of "Satellite Television Asian Region", it was founded by Hutchison Whampoa in 1991, and had been acquired by News Corporation in 1993. After 2009, the Star brand was mainly restricted to the now separately-owned Star China Media, as well as Star India, which operates primarily in India, but also distributes programming internationally via services targeting viewers of Indian descent. The remainder of the Star Asia Pacific business was later brought under the Fox International Channels division.

Star India (as well as all of the now Fox Networks Group's Asia Pacific operations. Although, the Asia Pacific operations do operate "Star"-branded TV services to date, to varying degrees. Not to be confused with the Japanese premium TV network of the same name, which albeit then a co-owned venture with three Japanese partners, is now a wholly separate business as the former 21st Century Fox sold its stake before the Disney acquisition completed.) was then acquired by Walt Disney as part of its acquisition of 21st Century Fox on March 20, 2019.

During an earnings call on August 5, 2020, Disney CEO Bob Chapek announced that Disney planned to launch a new international, general entertainment service under the "Star" brand name in 2021. The plan superseded a previously announced international expansion of the majority-controlled American streaming service, Hulu, which has only expanded outside the United States to Japan (the Japanese branch would be acquired by Nippon TV in 2014.). Chapek argued that, outside of the United States, the Hulu brand is not well known while Star is much more recognizable.

Launch 
Disney officially announced Star and Star+ on December 10, 2020, at its Investor Day Event. During the event, it was announced that Star would launch as a sixth brand tile within the Disney+ interface. Additional parental controls would be launched alongside Star's introduction. Although Star would be available at no extra cost to Disney+ subscribers, the introduction of Star would coincide with a price increase. Star was launched in Canada, United Kingdom, Western Europe, Australia, New Zealand and Singapore on February 23, 2021, while the service was launched in Hong Kong and Taiwan later in 2021. Disney promoted the launch by naming several stars in the International Star Registry.

Star+ was launched in Latin America on August 31, 2021. Star was to also launch in Central and Eastern Europe, Israel, South Africa and the MENA Region in 2022. Star was launched in Japan and South Korea on October 27, 2021, and November 12, 2021, respectively. It was indeed launched in May 2022 in South Africa and in June 2022 in various MENA and European countries.

Subsequently, the European feeds of Star Plus, Star Bharat, and Star Gold were rebranded as Utsav Plus, Utsav Bharat and Utsav Gold respectively on January 22, 2021, to avoid confusion with the streaming hub. Disney plans to produce more Korean, Japanese, and other Asian content under Star and Disney+ in the next few years.

Content

General content 
Star includes a range of content produced or otherwise owned by Disney and its subsidiaries, including television programs produced by ABC Signature, 20th Television, 20th Television Animation, FXP, and their divisions and predecessors, as well as films from the 20th Century Studios, 20th Century Animation, Searchlight Pictures, Touchstone Pictures, and Hollywood Pictures libraries and some films from the Miramax Films library. Much of the TV content was originally produced for Disney-owned networks and services such as ABC, FX, and Freeform. Other programs were originally commissioned by third-party networks, but have been made available on Star because Disney has retained the international distribution rights.

In Europe, Disney+ and Star offer local content from third-party distributors in addition to local in-house and co-productions. The reason for this is a regulation that requires a certain percentage of European productions. In order to comply with this requirement, Disney has entered into a partnership with various local distributors from France and Germany, among others. In Japan, besides Disney-owned contents, Star also provides anime series produced in the country.

Exclusive content 
Many productions for which the local first release is carried out by Star are advertised and offered as Star Originals or Star Exclusives. Most of these productions come from the streaming services (such as Hulu) and TV channels (such as ABC, Freeform, FX, ESPN, or National Geographic) of the Walt Disney Company. Selected productions from its sister services Star+ and Disney+ Hotstar may come to Star, Disney+ Original series and movies that not labeled under Disney, Pixar, Marvel, Star Wars or National Geographic are also released to Star outside United States and Latin America but remain their Disney+ Originals status. Disney also has local partnerships with licensors and distributes selected productions there of worldwide. Such a partnership exists, for example, with the Japanese TV broadcaster TBS.

Availability 
As described above, Star is available as part of the Disney+ service in many countries around the world. In countries where Disney+ is distributed as part of Disney+ Hotstar, many of the same programs are available as part of Hotstar's general-interest content, often categorized under hubs such as Star World. In the United States and in Latin America, the two other markets where Disney+ is available without the Star hub, much of this programming is instead available through Hulu and Star+ respectively.

Explanatory notes

References 

Disney+
2021 in film
2021 in television
2021 introductions
Internet properties established in 2021
Internet television streaming services
Subscription video on demand services
The Walt Disney Company
Disney jargon